Panjiayuan station is a station on Line 10 of the Beijing Subway. This station opened on December 30, 2012.  It is located in Panjiayuan Subdistrict, Chaoyang District.

Station layout 
The station has an underground island platform.

Exits 
There are 4 exits, lettered A, B, C1, and C2. Exits A and C2 are accessible.

Gallery

References

Railway stations in China opened in 2012
Beijing Subway stations in Chaoyang District